Borisoglebsky District is the name of several administrative and municipal districts in Russia.

Modern districts

Borisoglebsky District, Yaroslavl Oblast, an administrative and municipal district of Yaroslavl Oblast

Historical districts
Borisoglebsky District, Voronezh Oblast (1928–1949, 1963–2006), a former administrative district of Voronezh Oblast

See also
Borisoglebsky (disambiguation)

References